Hemp jewelry uses hemp twine material which is made from the Cannabis sativa plant, otherwise known as “Common Hemp”, which is cultivated to make goods such as food, fuel, clothing and textiles, cosmetics, paints, paper, building materials, and plastics, among others. Some types of hemp jewelry include bracelets, necklaces, anklets, rings, watches, masks, purses, and other adornments. The jewelry can also make use of other materials, such as glass, wood, bones, rocks, or gems.

Controversy
In 1922, growing political antidrug sentiment brought the Marijuana Tax Act before Congress where it was determined that no Cannabis plant had permit for cultivation. Many farmers and lobbyists objected to the act exclaiming that it would prevent the cultivation of hemp which at the time was used for many products in the American market. Despite the objections, Congress passed the Marijuana Tax Act and it was signed into law by President Franklin D. Roosevelt on August 2, 1937. The industrial hemp industry in America was then crippled for many years. Despite the act, American farmers were allowed to grow hemp for wartime needs in 1942 during the U.S. governments “Hemp for Victory” campaign. After the war, hemp mills were shut down. Hemp then returned to oblivion while elsewhere in the world hemp production flourished until the 1970s when a resurgence of antidrug policies outlawed hemp cultivations in the UK, Germany and Central and South America.

Macramé
Macramé is the ancient art form of knotting many different geometric patterns together without the use of hooks, needles, or hoops. This knotting can be used to not only make jewelry, but decorative coverings and wall hangings as well. Materials used for this include natural fibers such as cotton, jute, sisal, linen, and hemp which all come from plants and herbs and synthetic cords such as yarn, rayon, rattail, and nylon. Finally, they are processed into strands in which the fibers lay parallel to each other.

History of macramé
The terminology “macramé” dates back to an Arabic origin and translates to ‘fringe’. This skill originated in the 13th century when Arabian weavers would knot excess fabric at the edges of loomed fabric. It then became popular in the 14th and 15th centuries on French and Italian ships and was known to the sailors as “square knotting”, a fancy rope work used to make small decorative items aboard a ship. Sailors would describe the rope materials used by their circumference, however, now cord size is given in diameter length. They typically used cotton, hemp or steel cord to ornament the ships rigging. The round braids, hitching and Turk's head macramé styles were often used as protective wrappings for rails, spars and rigging. Mats were made from hemp and cotton to create nonskid surfaces on deck.

Macramé jewelry
There are many types of macramé knots. Macramé art also includes lacings and crossings created when two or more knot segments are joined. The square knot is considered the simplest knot and the half hitch, also known as the half knot, is the second most basic knot. These knots are typically used when making hemp jewelry. The half knot produces a spiral cord and the full square knot produces a flat cord. Beads and other decorations are also weaved into the jewelry. Hemp is ideal for this jewelry because it is durable and keeps its shape well.

1993 to present
In 1993, the United Kingdom lifted its ban on hemp and in 1994 Canada granted the business Hempline a research grant to grow the crop. By 1995, hundreds of entrepreneurs in Canada, the UK, Germany, Austria, Australia and the United States started hemp companies. Then in 1996 the North American Industrial Hemp Council was founded by environmentalists, entrepreneurs, and representatives from industry, government, agriculture and academia. This proved a strong commercial interest in hemp. By 1997, articles about industrial hemp appeared regularly in such publications as The Wall Street Journal, The Washington Post and The Kiplinger Letter. Also in 1996 the Adidas shoe company released “The Hemp”, a model whose upper section was made of hemp. When asked to discontinue the model Adidas president Steve Wynne replied “I don’t believe you will encounter anyone smoking our shoes any time soon”.

References

Further reading
Cole, Geo S. Cole's Encyclopedia of Dry Goods. New York: Root Newspaper Association, 1900.
LaBarge, Laura. Do Your Own Thing With Macramé. New York: Watson-Guptill Publications, 1973.
“Macramé” Retrieved on 15 March 16, 2009. http://www.targetwoman.com/articles/macrame.html
Roulac, John. Hemp Horizons: The Comeback of the World's Most Promising Plant. White River Junction, Vermont: Chelsea Green Publishing Company, 1997.
Rack, Norman. Macramé: Advanced Technique and Design. Garden City, New York : Doubleday & Company, Inc, 1972.
Hemp Facts, NAIHC, October 1997
Baskett, Mickey. "Making Beautiful Hemp & Bead Jewelry." 'Sterling Publishing Co., Inc. New York'. Date: 1999.
Klein, Dan. "THE SUBTLE ART OF SUGGESTION." 'Craft Arts International'. Date: Mar 2006. Issue: 66. Pages: 16-25

Jewelry
Types of jewellery